The Mount Calvary Baptist Church is a historic church at 11229 Kendall Road in Orange, Virginia.  Built in 1892, it is a well-preserved example of a rural church built for African-Americans during the Jim Crow era.  It is a frame structure with a metal roof and a projecting square tower topped by a pyramidal roof.  The main entrance is at the center of the tower, set in a pointed-arch opening, matching those of windows on the facade on either side.  Also on the property is a graveyard, established about 1919, with about 100 marked graves.

The building was added to the National Register of Historic Places in 2016.

See also
National Register of Historic Places listings in Orange County, Virginia

References

19th-century Episcopal church buildings
Buildings and structures in Orange County, Virginia
Churches completed in 1892
Baptist churches in Virginia
National Register of Historic Places in Orange County, Virginia
Churches on the National Register of Historic Places in Virginia